Morphinone is an opioid that is the intermediate when morphine is being converted to hydromorphone (trade name Dilaudid).

Chemical structure 
Morphinone can be described as the ketone of morphine.

Legal status 
Morphinone itself is an active opioid, though its potency is closer to codeine than morphine.  It is, however, an important precursor and would fall under the purview of the Controlled Substances Act within the United States.  Its legal status in other countries varies.

References

4,5-Epoxymorphinans
Semisynthetic opioids
Mu-opioid receptor agonists
Enones
Phenols